The Valley Vista League is a high school athletic league that is part of the CIF Southern Section. Members are located in east San Gabriel Valley region of Los Angeles County.

Members
 Charter Oak High School
 Covina High School
 Diamond Ranch High School
 West Covina High School
 Northview High School (Covina, California)
 San Dimas High School

 
CIF Southern Section leagues